The following are lists of women photographers:

Main list
List of women photographers

By country
List of American women photographers
List of Argentine women photographers
List of Australian women photographers
List of Austrian women photographers
List of British women photographers
List of Canadian women photographers
List of Chinese women photographers
List of Danish women photographers
List of Dutch women photographers
List of French women photographers
List of German women photographers
List of Japanese women photographers
List of Mexican women photographers
List of New Zealand women photographers
List of Nigerian women photographers
List of Norwegian women photographers
List of Spanish women photographers
List of Swedish women photographers